Castlefield Viaduct is a  disused railway viaduct built in 1892, which used to carry heavy rail traffic in and out of the Great Northern Warehouse, located in the Castlefield area of Manchester, England. It closed in 1969 and stood unused, though has been regularly maintained by National Highways.

The Grade II listed viaduct was designed by Heenan & Froude, the same engineering company behind Blackpool Tower. The viaduct is part of the Historical Railways Estate.

Sky park
Plans by the National Trust to turn it into a 'sky park' were unveiled in June 2021, with the work starting in March 2022.

The viaduct will have a test-opening from summer 2022 to summer 2023, during which time visitors will be able to have free guided visits.

See also
 Grade II listed buildings in Manchester

References

External links
 A fly-through of Castlefield viaduct

Railway bridges in Greater Manchester
Grade II listed bridges in Greater Manchester
Great Northern Railway (Great Britain)
Bridges completed in 1892
Parks and commons in Manchester